The 2015 Folds of Honor QuikTrip 500 was a NASCAR Sprint Cup Series race held on March 1, 2015, at Atlanta Motor Speedway in Hampton, Georgia. Contested over 325 laps on the  asphalt quad-oval, it was the second race of the 2015 NASCAR Sprint Cup Series season. Jimmie Johnson won the race, his first win of the season, while Kevin Harvick finished second. Dale Earnhardt Jr., Joey Logano and Matt Kenseth rounded out the top five.

Logano won the pole for the race in a qualifying session that saw 13 cars not post a single timed lap in the first of three rounds. Harvick led a race high of 116 laps on his way to a runner-up finish and his fifth of eight consecutive races finishing first or second. The race had 28 lead changes among 12 different drivers, as well as 10 caution flag periods for 54 laps. There was one red flag for a multi-car wreck in the closing laps of the race that lasted for nine minutes and one second.

Johnson's 71st career victory was his 4th at Atlanta Motor Speedway and the 13th at the track for Hendrick Motorsports. Despite the win, he left Atlanta trailing Logano by one point in the drivers' standings. Chevrolet took over the lead in the manufacturer standings by one over Ford.

The Folds of Honor QuikTrip 500 was carried by Fox Sports on the broadcast Fox network for the American television audience. The radio broadcast for the race was carried by the Performance Racing Network and Sirius XM NASCAR Radio.

Report

Background

It is a  quad-oval track with a seating capacity of 86,000. It opened in 1960 as a  standard oval. In 1994, 46 condominiums were built over the northeastern side of the track. In 1997, to standardize the track with Speedway Motorsports' other two  ovals, the entire track was almost completely rebuilt. The frontstretch and backstretch were swapped, and the configuration of the track was changed from oval to quad-oval. The project made the track one of the fastest on the NASCAR circuit.

Joey Logano entered the race as the points leader for the first time in his career following his win in the Daytona 500. Kevin Harvick, who dominated the race a year ago – leading 195 of the 325 laps before finishing 19th following a late race crash – entered second in the points five back of Logano, while Dale Earnhardt Jr. also entered five points back in third place. Jeff Gordon, who made his first career Sprint Cup Series start at Atlanta in 1992, made his 42nd and final start at the track.

Entry list
The entry list for the Folds of Honor QuikTrip 500 was released on Monday, February 23, 2015 at 3:07 p.m. Eastern time. Forty-eight drivers were entered for the race, all of whom were entered in the previous week's Daytona 500. Mike Bliss drove the No. 32 Ford for Go FAS Racing. Travis Kvapil drove the No. 44 Chevrolet for Team XTREME Racing in place of Reed Sorenson, who took over the No. 29 Toyota for RAB Racing. Brendan Gaughan drove the No. 62 Chevrolet for Premium Motorsports. Matt DiBenedetto ran the No. 83 Toyota for BK Racing. The No. 98 car for Phil Parsons Racing was entered as a Chevrolet entry.

Substitute drivers
Several substitute drivers took part in the race. Brett Moffitt drove the No. 55 Toyota in place of Brian Vickers, who would return to the car at Las Vegas Motor Speedway, the series' next scheduled race. Regan Smith once again drove the No. 41 Chevrolet in place of the suspended Kurt Busch. David Ragan was entered to run the No. 34 Ford for Front Row Motorsports, but was selected to run the No. 18 Toyota for Joe Gibbs Racing in place of the injured Kyle Busch. Team owner Joe Gibbs stated that his team appreciated "being able to work with Front Row Motorsports and (sponsor) CSX for David's availability", while also adding that the team "are fortunate to be able to have someone of David's caliber behind the wheel while Kyle recovers". On February 25, Front Row announced that Joe Nemechek would drive the No. 34 car in place of Ragan, with plans beyond that to be determined.

Test sessions
This weekend was the first of five race weekends that included an open test session for any team that wished to participate in it.

First session

Second session

Missing car

Early Friday morning, a black Ford dually pulling a white trailer carrying the No. 44 Team XTREME Racing Chevrolet was stolen from the team's hotel in Morrow, Georgia. The team's hauler was at the race track having left their race shop in Statesville, North Carolina two days earlier. The car was brought down separately to allow more work to be done on it at the shop. Since the team did not have a backup car, they were forced to withdraw from the race.

On August 3, 2015, Jason Terry pleaded guilty to the theft of the truck and trailer carrying the team car. The team tweeted about the guilty plea and "[h]ow bad this affected this race team."

First practice

Qualifying

Logano felt that it was "such a great way to follow Daytona" and that his team "ha[d] a lot of momentum and [they] definitely want to keep it going". The start of qualifying was delayed by 20 minutes because a number of cars had to go through NASCAR technical inspection more than once. Eventually, NASCAR decided to start the session anyway. As a result, 13 of the 47 cars never had a chance to post a lap time before the first round of qualifying ended. The issues angered several drivers and team managers.

Qualifying results

Driver change (post-qualifying)
Michael Annett, who originally failed to qualify for the race, drove the No. 33 Hillman-Circle Sport LLC Chevrolet in place of Brian Scott. Scott, who regularly competes in the Xfinity Series, voluntarily gave up his spot because, unlike himself, Annett is running for drivers points in the Sprint Cup Series. "It's a big deal," Annett said before Saturday's first practice. "I can't thank Mike Hillman and Brian Scott enough. We'd rather be in the (No.) 46 HScott Motorsport car, but we're running full-time and we need as many driver's points as we can get. Unfortunately, we won't get any owner's points for this, but being with a new crew chief, with Jay Guy, it's another hour-and-half of practice and another 500 miles (on Sunday) to work together. So looking back, we could have either gone home and watched this race or be able to work together so when we go to Las Vegas we're even stronger. I can't thank these guys enough for giving us this opportunity."

On race day, Annett's HScott Motorsports team ran the car, but under NASCAR rules, Circle Sport owner Joe Falk was credited with the owners' points.

Final practice
During the session, Harvick's car blew an engine and meant that he would have to start from the rear of the field. Harvick described the failure as "very rare" and that he was "glad that it happened today".

Race

First-half

Start
The race was scheduled to start at 1:16 p.m. on Sunday, but the start was delayed by overnight showers and track drying. The field rolled off pit road shortly after 1:45 p.m. and made a number of laps around the track and down pit road under caution speed. Finally, nearly an hour after the scheduled start time, Joey Logano lead the field to the green flag at 2:12 p.m. He pulled out to a four-second lead until the first caution of the race flew on lap 26 for overnight showers. This caution was a saving grace for Ricky Stenhouse Jr. who had a right-rear tire going down. Joe Nemechek stayed out to lead a lap before pitting and handing the lead back to Logano.

The race restarted on lap 32. Denny Hamlin tried to keep pace with Logano, but could not hang onto the point. Sam Hornish Jr. was forced to make an unscheduled stop on lap 42 to remove a windshield tear-off that was blocking the air intake of his car. The second caution of the race flew on lap 46 for Austin Dillon cutting down his right-rear tire and a piece of debris on the backstretch. Jeff Gordon hit a piece of the debris that created a hole  in diameter.

Trouble for Austin Dillon
The race restarted on lap 52. The third caution of the race flew on lap 60 for Austin Dillon cutting another right-rear tire and spun out in turn 1. His car came to a halt in the wet grass and was covered in mud by the time he got it out. Opening of pit road was delayed as a piece of rubber was caught stuck on the top of the catch fencing on the backstretch. Mike Bliss stayed out to lead a lap before hitting pit road and handing the lead back to Joey Logano.

The race restarted on lap 71 and Logano just jumped out ahead with relative ease. Eleven laps into the run, Kevin Harvick narrowed the game to half a second. He eventually took the lead on lap 87 after Logano got loose exiting turn 4. The fourth caution of the race flew on lap 94 after Landon Cassill blew an engine in turn 3. David Gilliland stayed out to take the lead before hitting pit road and handing the lead back to Harvick.

Green flag stops
The race restarted on lap 100. Joey Logano began to fall back as Harvick pulled to a two-second lead over Denny Hamlin. A number of cars started hitting pit road on lap 138 that triggered a rush of cars. Kevin Harvick gave up the lead on lap 140 to pit and handed the lead to Denny Hamlin. He stopped the next lap and gave the lead to Brad Keselowski who stopped the next lap and the lead cycled to Matt Kenseth, who was one of the first cars to pit on lap 138. Mike Bliss and Ron Hornaday Jr. had to serve a drive-through penalty for speeding on pit road. Eventually, Harvick took back the lead on lap 150.

Second-half
Matt Kenseth made an unscheduled stop on lap 168 for a possible vibration. He was running eighth at the time and exited pit road 28th and one lap down. To add insult to injury, he got trapped by the fifth caution of the race on lap 175 for debris on the front stretch. Kevin Harvick entered pit road as the race leader, but Denny Hamlin beat him off pit road to take the lead. The race restarted on lap 181, but did not make it more than a lap before debris brought out the sixth caution of the race after Jeb Burton hit the wall. Matt Kenseth made it back onto the lead lap.

The race restarted on lap 187. Kevin Harvick spun the tires on the restart and fell back a bit, but quickly climbed back to the tail of Hamlin in less than a lap. By lap 191, Harvick took back the lead. Eight laps later, Jimmie Johnson took the lead for the first time in the race. Harvick began running down Johnson with 110 laps to go. A number of cars hit pit road with 102 laps to go starting a rush of green flag stops. Johnson gave up the lead with 101 laps to go to pit and handed the lead to Casey Mears. He did not lead a lap as he was pitted before the start/finish line. As a result, Kevin Harvick cycled to the lead.

Casey Mears slapped the wall exiting turn 4 right in front of the leader. This allowed Jimmie Johnson to reel in Kevin Harvick momentarily before the latter pulled away. Debris on the backstretch brought out the seventh caution of the race with 74 laps to go. Jimmie Johnson beat Harvick off pit road to take back the lead.

Trouble on the backstretch

The race restarted with 69 laps to go and the eighth caution flew for a multi-car wreck on the backstretch. It started when Denny Hamlin got loose exiting turn 2, turned down into Ryan Newman who turned into Jamie McMurray who clipped Jeff Gordon who hit the inside wall head on, just beyond the end of the SAFER barrier. The race restarted with 63 laps to go. Carl Edwards was running eighth when he had a left-rear tire go down.

Kevin Harvick and Brad Keselowski started the last pit stop sequence of the race with 33 laps to go. Jimmie Johnson surrendered the lead with 32 laps to go and handed the lead to Clint Bowyer. He gave up the lead to pit with 30 laps to go and Brett Moffitt assumed the lead. He gave up the lead the next lap and the lead cycled back to Johnson. Kasey Kahne was forced to serve a drive-through penalty for an uncontrolled tire. To make matters worse for him, the ninth caution of the race flew with 28 laps to go when Cole Whitt lost an engine in turn 1. Matt Kenseth, who at one point was two laps down, stayed out when Johnson pitted to take back the lead.

Big wreck in Turn 3 and finish

The race restarted with 21 laps to go, before a major multi-car wreck occurred in turn 3, bringing out a 10th caution and involving an octet of cars. The incident started when Greg Biffle drove to the inside of Joe Nemechek entering Turn 3, but they made contact, sending both cars sliding up the track. Bowyer, Hornish Jr., Kyle Larson, Tony Stewart, Regan Smith and Ricky Stenhouse Jr. were also involved. On team radio, Nemechek was critical of Biffle's driving stating that he did not "know how he got me there in the left rear, that was messed up". The race was red flagged for nine minutes and 1 second in order to facilitate cleanup on the track with 20 laps to go. The race restarted with 14 laps to go and Jimmie Johnson held off Kevin Harvick to score his 71st career victory.

Post-race

Driver comments
In victory lane, Johnson stated that the result said "a lot of good things" and he was "just so excited that the guys could understand...so, this new team could understand what I was complaining about and things I didn't like about my race car". Harvick explained that he "had one bad restart there where I spun the tires on the outside and we just never recovered from that one" but stated that he had "to thank everybody on this car for everything they do".

Race results

Race statistics
 28 lead changes among 12 different drivers
 10 cautions for 54 laps; 1 red flag for 9 minutes, 1 second
 Time of race: 3 hours, 49 minutes, 6 seconds
 Average speed: 
 Jimmie Johnson took home $335,901 in winnings

Race awards
 Coors Light Pole Award: Joey Logano (28.477)
 3M Lap Leader: Kevin Harvick (116 laps)
 American Ethanol Green Flag Restart Award: Joey Logano (30.553)
 Duralast Brakes "Brake in The Race" Award: Joey Logano
 Freescale "Wide Open": Kevin Harvick
 Ingersoll Rand Power Move: Kevin Harvick, 8 positions
 MAHLE Clevite Engine Builder of the Race: Hendrick Engines, #4
 Mobil 1 Driver of the Race: Kevin Harvick (131.2 driver rating)
 Moog Steering and Suspension Problem Solver of The Race: Jimmie Johnson (crew chief Chad Knaus, 0.340 seconds)
 NASCAR Sprint Cup Leader Bonus: No winner: rolls over to $30,000 at next event
 Sherwin-Williams Fastest Lap: Denny Hamlin (Lap 2, 29.238)
 Sunoco Rookie of The Race: Jeb Burton

Media

Television
Fox Sports covered their eleventh race at the Atlanta Motor Speedway, and their first since 2010. Mike Joy, Larry McReynolds, and three-time Atlanta winner Darrell Waltrip had the call in the booth for the race. Jamie Little, Chris Neville, and Matt Yocum handled the pit road duties for the television side.

Radio
PRN had the radio call for the race which was also simulcasted on Sirius XM NASCAR Radio. Doug Rice and Mark Garrow called the race in the booth when the field went racing through the front stretch. Rob Albright called the race from a billboard in turn 2 when the field went racing through turns 1 and 2 and halfway down the backstretch. Pat Patterson called the race from atop the condos outside of turn 4 when the field went racing through the other half of the backstretch and through turns 3 and 4. Brad Gillie, Brett McMillan, Steve Richards, and Wendy Venturini worked pit road for the radio side.

Standings after the race

Drivers' Championship standings

Manufacturers' Championship standings

Note: Only the first sixteen positions are included for the driver standings.

Notes

References

Fold of Honor QuikTrip 500
Folds of Honor QuikTrip 500
NASCAR races at Atlanta Motor Speedway